is a railway station on the Nanao Line in the city of Kahoku, Ishikawa Prefecture, Japan, operated by the West Japan Railway Company (JR West).

Lines

Station layout
The station consists of two opposed ground-level side platforms connected by a footbridge. The station has a Midori no Madoguchi staffed ticket office.

Platforms

Adjacent stations

History
The station opened on April 24, 1898. With the privatization of Japanese National Railways (JNR) on April 1, 1987, the station came under the control of JR West.

Passenger statistics
In fiscal 2015, the station was used by an average of 1,338 passengers daily (boarding passengers only).

Surrounding area
 former Unoke Town Hall
 Unoke Junior High School
 Unoke Elementary School

See also
 List of railway stations in Japan

References

External links

  

Railway stations in Ishikawa Prefecture
Stations of West Japan Railway Company
Railway stations in Japan opened in 1898
Nanao Line
Kahoku, Ishikawa